Short track speed skating at the 2019 European Youth Olympic Winter Festival was held from 11 to 15 February at Skenderija Hall in Sarajevo, Bosnia and Herzegovina.

Competition schedule
Sessions that included the event finals are shown in bold.

Medal summary

Medal table

Boys' events

Girls' events

Team event

References 

European Youth Olympic Winter Festival
2019 European Youth Olympic Winter Festival events
2019